The graïle, (or Occitan graile) is a woodwind instrument of Languedoc, France, resembling a primitive oboe.  It is played in Monts de Lacaune (in the department of Tarn) and surrounding areas including Bezime.

Details
The instrument consists of three turned wooden parts reinforced at the joints with horn.

Playing
The graïle uses a double reed, the caramèla.

Oboes
French musical instruments